Aigialus is a genus of fungi in the family Massariaceae.

References

External links
Index Fungorum

Pleosporales